Shangshan, shang-shan, or variation, may refer to:

Places
 Shangshan Village, Dacheng Township, Changhua County, Taiwan; see Dacheng, Changhua
 Shangshan Village, Qionglin Township, Hsinchu County, Taiwan; see Qionglin
 Shangshan Village, Yuduan Township,  Xiangxiang City (county), Xiangtan City (prefecture), Hunan Province, China, see Yuduan, Xiangxiang
 Shangshan Township (上衫乡), Xiushui County, Jiujiang Prefecture, Jiangxi Province, China; see List of township-level divisions of Jiangxi
 Shangshan Town (商山镇), Xiuning County, Huangshan City, Anhui Province, China; see List of township-level divisions of Anhui
 Shangshan Site, Pujiang County, Zhejiang, China; an archaeological site, see List of Major National Historical and Cultural Sites in Zhejiang

People
 Yang Shangshan (楊上善; 7th century CE) author of the Yellow Emperor's Inner Canon 太素 Taisu

Mythological
 Shǎngshàn Leigong (Thundergod Shangshan); an East Asian thunder god, see List of thunder gods

Other uses
 Shangshan Subdialect, a subdialect of Wuhua dialect

See also

Shang (disambiguation)
Shan (disambiguation)
Shanshan (disambiguation)
Shanshang District, Tainan, Taiwan
Shanshang Subdialect, see Danzhou dialect
, Japanese band